Borst is a Dutch surname of variable origin. Notable people with the surname include:

Alexander Borst (born 1957), German neurobiologist
Cathy Borst (born 1959), Canadian curler
Els Borst (1932–2014), Dutch politician and government minister
Everina Borst (1888-1943), Belgian radio personality known as Mother Sarov
Hugo Borst (born 1962), Dutch writer, editor, TV personality and critic 
Jeremiah Borst (1830–1890), American northwestern pioneer
Lawrence Borst (1927-2016), American veterinarian and politician
Peter Bouck Borst (1826-1882), American urban planner
Peter I. Borst, (1797-1848) US House Representative from New York 
Piet Borst (born 1934), Dutch molecular biologist, cancer researcher and columnist
Selma Borst (born 1989), Dutch distance runner

Places

Slovenia
Boršt, Brežice
Boršt, Koper
Boršt, Metlika
Boršt pri Dvoru

References

Dutch-language surnames